Awards and decorations of Latvia are governed by the Republic of Latvia Law on State Honours of 2004, last amended in 2010.

State decorations

State orders, medals and other decorations are bestowed by the President of Latvia or a person assigned by him on May 4 - Restoration of Independence Day, November 11 - Lāčplēsis Day and November 18 – Proclamation Day of the Republic of Latvia, as well as on other days on special occasions.

The President of Latvia is awarded with the highest order, the Order of the Three Stars, upon starting to hold his office after taking the oath.

Orders

The Order of the Three Stars
The Order of Viesturs
The Cross of Recognition

Insignia of the Orders

the Order with the Golden Chain (only the Order of Three Stars);
the Cross of the Commander of the Grand Cross (First Class Order);
the Cross of the Grand Officer (Second Class Order);
the Cross of the Commander (Third Class Order);
the Cross of the Officer (Fourth Class Order);
the Cross of the Knight (Fifth Class Order);
the Medals of Honour (First Level, Second Level, Third Level).

Medals and other decorations
The Order of Lāčplēsis (awarded 1920–1928)
Commemorative Medal for Participants of the Barricades of 1991 (awarded since 1996, state award since 2010 under the Law on State Honours)
 (awarded in 1928)

Other decorations

 The Award of the Cabinet of Ministers (Ministru kabineta balva)
 Commemorative Medal for Advancing Latvia's Membership to NATO (2004, awarded by the Minister of Defence)
 The Fatherland Award (Tēvzemes balva, awarded 1937–1940, predecessor of the Award of the Cabinet of Ministers)
 Aizsargi Cross of Merit (Aizsargu Nopelnu krusts, awarded 1927–1940)
 Aizsargi Medal "For Effort" ("For Diligence'", Aizsargu medaļa "Par uzcītību", awarded 1927–1940)

Order of precedence of decorations

The Order of Three Stars
The Order of Viesturs
The Cross of Recognition
The Medal of Honour of the Order of Three Stars
The Medal of Honour of the Order of Viesturs
The Medal of Honour of the Cross of Recognition
The Commemorative Medal for Participants of the Barricades of 1991
Other awards and foreign awards

References

Information on state orders on the official website of the President of Latvia
Translation of the Latvian law on state awards concerning the bearing of orders
Law on State Honours of 2004 (in Latvian)